The Polish Panel Survey (POLPAN, Polskie Badanie Panelowe) is a program of panel surveys of the population of Poland carried out by the Research Team on Comparative Social Inequality at the Institute of Philosophy and Sociology of the Polish Academy of Sciences. The study started in 1988 and is repeated in five-year intervals. The focus of the Polish Panel Survey is to describe Poland's social structure and its change.

POLPAN data and documentation from the waves 1988, 1993, 1998, and 2003 are available for download at GESIS – Leibniz Institute for the Social Sciences and from the Polish Social Data Archive. The latter archive also contains 2008 POLPAN wave data and documentation.

Methodology and scope 

Initially, in 1988, the survey was conducted among a national sample representing Poland’s adult population (aged 21–65), with N = 5,817 respondents. In 1993, this sample was randomly reduced to 2,500 individuals, whom researchers tried to reach in each of the consecutive five-year waves. To ensure an adequate age balance, additional subsamples involving young cohorts have been supplemented later. For example, the 2008 sample comprised 1,825 respondents of whom 1,244 belong to the strict panel, and 581 are newly added individuals aged 21–25 years. In 2013 an attempt was made to contact all respondents (7,261) who had ever participated in the study, which resulted in achieving a sample of 2,780. The 2018 sample comprises 2,161 respondents.

Data collection is carried out through questionnaire interviews by the Centre of Sociological Research at IFiS PAN.

The survey collects the following information:
 Employment (employment, self-employment, irregular employment and additional jobs, unemployment and housework);
 Occupational history
 Social, economic and political opinions and attitudes (chances of success and sources of conflicts, opinions about income, opinions about society, about privatization and the market, status evaluation and views on social issues);
 Friends and acquaintances;
 Family and household;
 Physical and psychological health;
 Religion;
 Intelligence (Raven's Test);
 Computer and Internet;
 Demographics.

See also 

Socio-Economic Panel (SOEP)
British Household Panel Survey (BHPS)
Household, Income and Labour Dynamics in Australia Survey (HILDA)
Panel Study of Income Dynamics (PSID)
LISS panel (LISS)
Survey on Household Income and Wealth (SHIW)

Notes 

Selected bibliography of POLPAN:

Books:

External links 
POLPAN official website (URL accessed 2017-01-11)
POLPAN data in the GESIS Data Catalogue (URL accessed 2017-01-11)
POLPAN data in ADS (URL accessed 2017-01-11)
Centre of Sociological Research (ORBS) (URL accessed 2017-01-11)
Institute of Philosophy and Sociology of the Polish Academy of Sciences (URL accessed 2017-01-11)

Panel data
Cohort studies
Research institutes in Poland